Blakeney is a surname. Notable people with the surname include:

Allan Blakeney (1925–2011), Canadian politician
 Antonio Blakeney (born 1996), American basketball player in the Israeli Basketball Premier League
Ben Bruce Blakeney (1908–1963), American lawyer
Edward Blakeney (1778–1868), British field marshal
Frederick Blakeney (1913–1990), Australian diplomat
Issac Blakeney (born 1992), American football player
John Blakeney (died 1747), Irish MP for Athenry
John Blakeney (died 1781), Irish MP for Athenry
John Blakeney (died 1789), Irish MP for Athenry
Justina Blakeney, American writer
Michael Blakeney, British and Australian academic
Olive Blakeney (1899–1959), American actress
R.B.D. Blakeney (1872–1952), British Army general and fascist politician
Robert Blakeney (died 1733), Irish MP for Athenry
Robert Blakeney (died 1762), Irish MP for Athenry
Theophilus Blakeney, Irish MP for Athenry, soldier, and High Sheriff of County Galway
General William Blakeney, 1st Baron Blakeney (1672–1761), Irish soldier
William Theophilus Blakeney (1832–1898), Registrar-General for Queensland
William Blakeney (died 1804), Irish MP for Athenry